Fishbowl California is a 2018 comedy-drama film directed by Michael A. MacRae. It stars Steve Olson, Katrina Bowden, Katherine Cortez, Kate Flannery, Quinton Aaron, Tim Bagley, Jenna Willis and Richard Riehle. It premiered on March 24, 2018, at the Columbus International Film & Animation Festival. It was released by Gravitas Ventures on May 1, 2018.

Plot 
Rodney (Steve Olson), about to turn 30, has no job or ambition. This changes when he meets June (Katherine Cortez), a reclusive widow.

Cast
 Steve Olson as Rodney
 Katherine Cortez as June
 Katrina Bowden as Tess
 Kate Flannery as Susan
 Quinton Aaron as Rad Chad
 Tim Bagley as Woody
 Richard Riehle as Glen
 Max Adler as Billy Kobrin
 Jenna Willis as Olivia
 Josh Sussman as Philip

Production 
Filming took place in Los Angeles, primarily North Hollywood, West Hollywood and Burbank, between March and April 2017.

Release 
The film premiered in March 2018 at the Columbus International Film & Animation Festival and was released by Gravitas Ventures on May 1, 2018.

Reception 
Aaron Peterson of The Hollywood Outsider praised Cortez's acting and wrote that the film is "emphatically worth the visit".

Matthew Parkinson of Cinemarter.com gave it a middling review: "Fishbowl California is a harmless but unambitious indie comedy".

Jeff York of the Chicago Independent Film Critic's Circle noted, "There's a quiet nobility to these has-been's and never-was' on display in Fishbowl California. This little indie-that-could will put a lump in your throat, in between laughs. The movie is quite the Valentine to the town and its lovable eccentrics."

John Arkelian of Artsforum Magazine gave it a "B-/B", saying the story has "a quirky sensibility, with nice dryly comedic bits with assorted supporting players."

References

External links
 
 

2018 films
Films set in California
2018 comedy-drama films
American comedy-drama films
Films shot in Los Angeles
Films shot in Los Angeles County, California
2010s English-language films
2010s American films
English-language comedy-drama films